Lesley Ann Clark (born 10 August 1948) is a former Australian politician. Born in Harwich in the United Kingdom, she was a school guidance officer and lecturer in education at James Cook University in Queensland before entering politics. She sat on Mulgrave Shire Council from 1985 to 1990. In 1989, she was elected to the Legislative Assembly of Queensland as the Labor member for Barron River. She was defeated in 1995, but re-elected in 1998. Clark retired in 2006.

References

1948 births
Living people
Members of the Queensland Legislative Assembly
People from Harwich
Australian Labor Party members of the Parliament of Queensland
21st-century Australian politicians
21st-century Australian women politicians
Women members of the Queensland Legislative Assembly